Benjamin "Ben" Bender (born March 7, 2001) is an American professional soccer player who plays as a midfielder for Charlotte FC of Major League Soccer. Bender was the first overall selection in the 2022 MLS SuperDraft.

Career

Youth and college
Prior to playing college soccer, Bender played youth soccer, from the age of 6 through 15 for Coach Barry Stitz and Fewster FC. The one-team, independent Fewster FC Club won 4 Maryland State Cups, 2 USYSA Regional Championships and played for the U15 USYSA National Championships in 2015 2015 USYSA U15 National Championships page. After USYSA changed their age categories (to birth year), Bender then played academy soccer, one season for the Philadelphia Union academy and four years for Baltimore Armour. Concurrently, Bender played high school soccer for Calvert Hall College High School in Towson, Maryland. With Calvert Hall, Bender served as the team's captain, being named an Allstate All-American his junior year, and earning honors from TopDrawerSoccer.com, All-Maryland Interscholastic Athletic Association honors, and was named a Baltimore Sun All-Metro selection.

Ahead of the 2020 NCAA Division I men's soccer season, Bender signed a National Letter of Intent to play collegiately for the University of Maryland, College Park. Due to the COVID-19 pandemic and its impact on sporting events, Bender did not make his Maryland debut until February 19, 2021, starting in a 2–3 loss to Penn State. On March 27, 2021, Bender scored his first collegiate goal against Northwestern University. Bender would finish the 2020 season appearing in all 11 matches for the Terrapins, scoring twice.

Senior 
Bender spent the summer of 2021 playing for FC Baltimore Christos of the National Premier Soccer League, where he would appear seven times for the team, scoring six goals. He won the NPSL Young Player of the Year Award following the season.

Professional
Following his freshman season with Maryland, he signed a Generation adidas contract with Major League Soccer, an expected top five draft pick, Bender was selected first overall in the 2022 MLS SuperDraft by Charlotte FC. Bender became the third ever player from the University of Maryland to be selected first overall in the MLS SuperDraft, and the first since Maurice Edu was selected first overall in 2007.

Honors 
Individual
NPSL Young Player of the Year: 2021

References

External links
Maryland Terrapins profile
 

2001 births
Living people
American soccer players
Association football midfielders
Charlotte FC draft picks
Charlotte FC players
Christos FC players
Major League Soccer first-overall draft picks
Major League Soccer players
Maryland Terrapins men's soccer players
National Premier Soccer League players
Soccer players from Baltimore
All-American men's college soccer players